= Rugby union in Bhutan =

Rugby was a largely unknown sport in Bhutan until 2009, when the game was introduced by trainer Harry Shaw, who established a training ground for the sport in Thimphu.
